Pyun Hye-young (born 1972) is a South Korean writer.

Life
Pyun Hye-young was born in Seoul in 1972. She earned her undergraduate degree in creative writing and graduate degree in Korean literature from Hanyang University. After receiving these degrees, Pyun worked as an office worker, and many office workers appear in her stories.

Work
Pyun began publishing in 2000 and published three collections of stories, Aoi Garden, To The Kennels, and Evening Courtship as well as the novel Ashes and Red. In 2007, To the Kennels won the Hankook Ilbo Literary Award, in 2009 the short story O Cuniculi won the Yi Hyo-Seok Literature prize and then the Today's Young Writer Award in 2010, while in 2011 Evening Courtship won the Dong-in Literary Award. Her works have several themes including alienation in modern life, an apocalyptic world, and they are often infused with grotesque images. The novel Ashes and Red explores irony and the dual nature of humanity

Works in English
 “O Cuniculi”
 ”Mallow Gardens” and ”Corpses” (This is a PDF file hosted by Acta Koreana)
 ”To the Kennels” in AZALEA, Issue 2, 2008, p. 307
 Evening Proposal, translated by Park Youngsuk and  Gloria Cosgrove Smith, Dalkey Archive Press, 2016, 
 The Hole, translated by Sora Kim-Russell, Arcade Publishing, 2017,  Shirley Jackson Award
 City of Ash and Red, translated by Sora Kim-Russell, Arcade Publishing, 2018, 
 The Law of Lines, translated by Sora Kim-Russell, Arcade Publishing, 2020,

Works in Korean (partial)
 Fiction collections
 《아오이가든》(문학과지성사, 2005)
 《사육장 쪽으로》(문학동네, 2007)
 《저녁의 구애》(문학과지성사, 2011)
《죽은 자로 하여금》 (현대문학, 2018)

 Long fiction
 《재와 빨강》(창비, 2010)
 《서쪽 숲에 갔다》(문학과지성사, 2012)

Awards
 2007 40th Hankook Ilbo Literary Award for her collection To the Kennels
 2007 The 5th Proud Cultural Impression award
2009 The 10th Hyo-Seok Lee Literature Award
2010 The 18th Today's Young Artist Award (Literature Division)
 2012 42nd Dong-in Literary Award
 2014 48th Yi Sang Literary Award

References

External links
 An interview with Pyun Hye-Young at Acta Koreana
 Witness to Solitude: Novelist Pyun Hye-young LIST Magazine Vol.12 Summer 2011

1972 births
South Korean novelists
Living people
Seoul Institute of the Arts alumni
People from Seoul
Jeolgang Pyeon clan